The 2000 West Virginia gubernatorial election took place on November 7, 2000. Incumbent Republican Governor Cecil Underwood ran for re-election to a second consecutive term in office, but was defeated by Democratic U.S. Representative Bob Wise.  Concurrently, the state voted for the opposite party federally, choosing Republican nominee, George W. Bush over Democratic nominee Al Gore in the presidential election that year. , this was the last time in which an incumbent West Virginia Governor lost re-election.

Democratic primary

Candidates
Jim Lees, attorney and candidate in 1996
Bob Wise, U.S. Representative

Results

Republican primary
Governor Cecil Underwood was easily re-nominated in the Republican primary, defeating three other candidates by a wide margin.

Results

General election

Debates
Complete video of debate, October 18, 2000

Results

References

See also

West Virginia
2000
Gubernatorial